Golubić is a Serbo-Croatian toponym. It may refer to:

 Golubić, Šibenik-Knin County, a village near Knin, Croatia
 Golubić, Zadar County, a village near Obrovac, Croatia
 Golubić, Bosnia and Herzegovina, a village near Bihać
 Golubić (surname), a South Slavic surname

See also
Golubići (disambiguation)
Golubac (disambiguation)
Golubovići